Televisión Canaria is a Spanish free-to-air television network for the Canary Islands. Although the registered office and principal place of TV Canaria is located in Santa Cruz de Tenerife.

The creation of the channel arose in the 1980s with promulgation of the law 8/1984 of the autonomous region of Canaries relating to Broadcasting and Televisión Canaria. The first broadcast was made on the 21 August 1999 under the name Televisión Autonómica de Canarias (TVAC), in 2001 the company adopted the simpler name of Televisión Canaria and the slogan la nuestra.

The channel broadcasts on analogue and TDT throughout the Canary Islands, and on TDT in the rest of Spain. TV Canaria also broadcasts three other channels, TV Canaria 2, an online channel named TV Canaria Net and an international channel named TVCi which broadcasts in North and South America.

Logos and identities

References

External links
Official Site 
TV Canaria at LyngSat Address

Mass media in the Canary Islands
Mass media in Santa Cruz de Tenerife
Television stations in Spain
FORTA
Spanish-language television stations
Companies of the Canary Islands
Television channels and stations established in 1999
1999 establishments in Spain